Christ Church is the oldest English church in the town of Tiruchirappalli. It is situated to the north of the famous Teppakulam tank.

References 

 

Churches in Tiruchirappalli